Live is a 2002 live album by American rock band Meat Puppets. It is also known as Live at Maxwell's.  The album includes a previously unreleased song, "Way That It Are."

Track listing
All songs by Curt Kirkwood unless otherwise noted.
  
 "Intro" (Kirkwood, Kyle Ellison) – 4:35
 "Armed and Stupid" – 3:01
 "Wipe Out" – 3:39
 "I Quit" – 3:01
 "Hercules" (Kirkwood, Shandon Sahm) – 3:13
 "Oh, Me" – 3:11
 "Push the Button" – 4:35
 "Lamp" – 5:36
 "Pieces of Me" – 3:32
 "Up on the Sun" – 7:21
 "Take Off Your Clothes" (Kirkwood, Ellison) – 4:49
 "Fatboy / Fat / Requiem" (Kirkwood, Ellison) – 9:41
 "Lake of Fire" – 2:38
 "Way That It Are" (Kirkwood, Ellison) – 4:08
 "You Love Me" (Kirkwood, Ellison, Andrew Duplantis) – 3:51
 "Plateau" – 2:47
 "Touchdown King" – 6:02

Personnel
Meat Puppets
 Curt Kirkwood – guitar, vocals, keyboards
 Kyle Ellison – backing vocals, guitar, keyboards
 Andrew Duplantis – backing vocals, bass, keyboards
 Shandon Sahm – drums

Production and other credits
Executive producers – Brad Navin and Usher Winslett
Editing and mastering – Alex Kokollo
Project manager – Jessica Nathanson
Sound engineer – David Claassen
Album art – Elmo Kirkwood
Band photo – Todd V. Wolfson
Design – David Richman
Liner Notes – Matt Houser

References

Meat Puppets albums
2002 live albums